Thomas Waring may refer to:

 Thomas Waring (barrister) (1828–1898), Irish barrister and conservative Member of Parliament
 Thomas R. Waring Jr. (1907–1993), American newspaper editor and segregationist
 Tom Waring (1906–1980), English professional association footballer